The Boone Formation a discrete and definable unit of cherty limestone rock strata located in northwest Arkansas and northeast Oklahoma.

The stratigraphy of the Boone Formation dates to the Mississippian age.

The Boone Formation is rich in fossils, and occasionally preserves the remains of sharks' teeth in outcrops along Buffalo National River.

Equivalent rocks of the Osagean in southwest Missouri include the Pierson Limestone, Fern Glen Formation, Reeds Spring Formation, Elsey Formation (including the Grand Falls Chert), Burlington Limestone and the Keokuk Limestone.

See also

References

Carboniferous Kansas
Carboniferous Arkansas
Carboniferous geology of Oklahoma
Carboniferous southern paleotemperate deposits
Carboniferous southern paleotropical deposits